The Infernal Power (German: Die höllische Macht) is a 1922 German silent film directed by Robert Wiene and starring Thea Kasten, Emil Lind and Ossip Runitsch. The film is now a lost film, and virtually nothing is known of its plot or genre.

Cast
 Thea Kasten   
 Emil Lind   
 Ossip Runitsch   
 Hans Schweikart

References

Bibliography
 Jung, Uli & Schatzberg, Walter. Beyond Caligari: The Films of Robert Wiene. Berghahn Books, 1999.

External links

1922 films
Films of the Weimar Republic
German silent feature films
Films directed by Robert Wiene
Lost German films
German black-and-white films